Just South of Heaven is an EP by Crime & the City Solution, released in 1985 through Mute Records.

Reception

The EP received quite favorable reviews upon release. Mat Snow, writing for NME, noted similarities of the band's sound to that of The Birthday Party and compared Bonney's vocals to "Tom Waits throwing up into a fried-egg sandwich." He writes however, that "Harvey, Soundtracks and the Howard brothers are developing into something equally commanding [to that of The Birthday Party's music] [...] should Simon Bonney ever outgrow this fetishism, then Crime and the City Solution will achieve the truly distinct greatness promised by this record. They're just a kiss away from the pearly gates." Writing for Trouser Press, David Sheridan called the album "cleaner and more powerful [than The Dangling Man EP]: all six tracks work well. Howard's guitar is as strong as ever, but piano and organ figure just as prominently. A hauntingly beautiful record by a well- integrated band."

Allmusic went on to pick the EP as the highlight of the band's discography, with Robert Gordon writing: "Aussies with a gothic vision of the American South."

Track listing

Personnel 
Crime & the City Solution
Simon Bonney – vocals
Epic Soundtracks – drums, bells, piano, organ
Mick Harvey – guitar, organ, piano, slide guitar
Harry Howard – bass guitar, acoustic guitar
Rowland S. Howard – guitar, slide guitar, feedback, piano, saxophone
Production and additional personnel
Bronwyn Adams – painting
Flood – engineering

Charts

References 

1985 EPs
Crime & the City Solution albums
Mute Records EPs